Flight 12 may refer to:

Aeroflot Flight 12, crashed on 13 July 1963
Continental Airlines Flight 12, crashed on 1 July 1965

0012